David Moscrop is a Canadian podcaster, political scientist, columnist, and the author of the 2019 book Too Dumb for Democracy?

Education 
Moscrop has a PhD in political science from the University of British Columbia and was a post-doctoral Scholarly Communication Lab fellow at the University of Ottawa.

Career and views 
Moscrop has written for both  The Washington Post and Maclean's Magazine. He is the author of Too Dumb for Democracy? a 2019 book that documents how people make decisions against their own interests. 

He hosts the podcast Open to Debate.

Moscrop advocates for deliberative democracy.

Personal life 
Moscrop lives in Ottawa.

References

External links 

 2018 Ted Talk Are We Too Dumb for Democracy?

Year of birth missing (living people)
Living people
Canadian podcasters
21st-century Canadian writers
Canadian columnists
Canadian political scientists
University of British Columbia alumni
University of Ottawa alumni
Writers from Ottawa